Flattop Mountain is a mountain in the North Carolina High Country, at the village of Sugar Mountain.  It is wholly in the Pisgah National Forest.  Its elevation reaches .  Feeder streams from the mountain flow directly into the Linville River, except along the north slope where Flattop Creek flows directly into the Elk River; the mountain is partitioned by the Eastern Continental Divide.

Because of its adjacent proximity, it has been mistaken as part of Sugar Mountain.

Attractions
Linville Ridge Golf and Country Club is open late Spring to early Fall; it is situated on the summit of Flattop Mountain.

See also
List of mountains in North Carolina

References

Mountains of North Carolina
Mountains of Avery County, North Carolina